Cassionympha is a genus of butterflies from the subfamily Satyrinae in the family Nymphalidae.

Species
Cassionympha camdeboo (Dickson, 1981)
Cassionympha cassius (Godart, [1824])
Cassionympha detecta (Trimen, 1914)

External links 
 "Cassionympha van Son, 1955" at Markku Savela's Lepidoptera and Some Other Life Forms

Satyrini
Butterfly genera